Countess of Winchilsea is a title given to the wife of the Earl of Winchilsea. Women who have held the title include:

 Elizabeth Finch, 1st Countess of Winchilsea (1556–1634)
 Anne Finch, Countess of Winchilsea (1661–1720)
 Essex Finch, Countess of Nottingham  (–1684)
 Frances Finch, Countess of Winchilsea and Nottingham (–1734)
 Georgiana Finch-Hatton, Countess of Winchilsea (1791–1835)
 Constance Finch-Hatton, Countess of Winchilsea (1823–1878)
 Margaretta Finch-Hatton, Countess of Winchilsea (1885–1952)